Warta Zawiercie is a Polish football club from Zawiercie.

History 
Warta Zawiercie was founded in 1921. First team players played in the white-red kits and reserve players played in the blue-red kits. The players played, prepared pitch, equipment and organized matches. In 1930 and 1932 club played in the playoffs for the Polish First League, but lost both. During World War II the club did not exist and many of club's members was killed. Warta Zawiercie was reactivated in 1945 and started playing in B-class. In 1949 Warta was promoted to A-class. Between 1951 and 1955 the club played under the Stal Zawiercie name. In 1952 the club was first in their group, but lost in two-legged tie with Górnik Brzozowice-Kamień. In 1962-63 season Warta Zawiercie was second in Polish Third League and lost playoffs for first place. One season later Warta was first in their group but lost playoffs for Polish Second League with Victoria Jaworzno, Dąb Katowice, Star Starachowice and Resovia Rzeszów. In 1966 the new stadium was built – 1000th-Anniversary of Polish State Stadium. In 1979 there was a fusion between Warta Zawiercie and Włókniarz Zawiercie and as a result, MRKS Warta Zawiercie was created. In 1998 Warta was promoted to Polish Fourth League and one year later to Polish Third League. In 2001 Warta was relegated to Polish Fourth League and through debts (500,000 zlotys) Warta was resolved.

In 2004 Warta Zawiercie was reactivated. In 2006 the club was resolved again.

In 2009 the club was reactivated again. In 2010 Warta Zawiercie was promoted to A-class (7-th level).

Current squad 
Source:. Accurate as of June 30, 2010

External links

References 

Zawiercie County
Football clubs in Silesian Voivodeship
Association football clubs established in 1921
1921 establishments in Poland